St. Andrew's Church is a historic church located at 44078 St. Andrew's Church Road, California near  Leonardtown, St. Mary's County, Maryland. It was built in 1766 to serve as the parish church of St. Andrew's Parish, which had been established in 1744. It is a rectangular brick box church laid in Flemish bond with a gable roof and round-arched windows trimmed with brick segmental arches.  At two corners stand two-story square brick towers with a diminutive spire. Richard Boulton designed the church in 1766; he was also responsible for the outstanding carving and ornamentation at Sotterley. George Plater (1735-1792), who briefly served as Maryland's governor before his death, was an active parish member, serving twenty-eight years as a vestryman.

It was listed on the National Register of Historic Places in 1973.

See also
 List of post 1692 Anglican parishes in the Province of Maryland

References

External links

, including undated photo, at Maryland Historical Trust

Churches on the National Register of Historic Places in Maryland
Churches in St. Mary's County, Maryland
Anglican parishes in the Province of Maryland
Episcopal church buildings in Maryland
Churches completed in 1766
18th-century Episcopal church buildings
Historic American Buildings Survey in Maryland
Leonardtown, Maryland
Religious organizations established in 1744
National Register of Historic Places in St. Mary's County, Maryland